Bednarski (feminine: Bednarska, plural: Bednarscy) is a Polish surname. Notable people with the surname include:

 Bob Bednarski (1944–2004), American heavyweight weightlifter
 Fred Bednarski (fl. 1957), Polish American football placekicker
 John Bednarski (born 1952), Canadian ice hockey defenceman
 Josef Bednarski (born 1941), Polish professional wrestler and bodybuilder
 Jacek Bednarski (1939–2008), Polish chess International Master
 Krzysztof Bednarski (born 1953), Polish sculptor
 Scott Bednarski (born 1966), American professional wrestler
 Steven Bednarski (born 1973), Canadian historian and actor

Polish-language surnames